Ridsdalea grandis (synonym Gardenia grandis) is a species of flowering plant in the family Rubiaceae native to the Malay Peninsula, Sumatra, and Borneo; it is the type species of the genus Ridsdalea.

References

Gardenieae
Flora of Malesia